Wiejce  (formerly German Waitze) is a village in the administrative district of Gmina Skwierzyna, within Międzyrzecz County, Lubusz Voivodeship, in western Poland.

The village has a population of 90.

The village neighbours Wiejce Palace, a historic country house and is part of the historic Wiejce Palace Estate.

References

Wiejce